Stoned, also known as The Wild and Wycked World of Brian Jones in the United Kingdom, is a 2005 biographical film about Brian Jones, one of the founding members of The Rolling Stones. The film was directed by Stephen Woolley, and written by Neal Purvis and Robert Wade. Leo Gregory played the role of Brian Jones and Paddy Considine as Frank Thorogood.

Plot
The film is a cinematic work of historical fiction, taking as its premise the idea that Jones was murdered by Frank Thorogood, a builder who had been hired to renovate and improve Jones's house Cotchford Farm in East Sussex, though there is a curious ghost-epilogue where Jones comes back to earth to thank chauffeur/minder Tom Keylock – not Thorogood – for making him into an immortal martyr. The film also paints a picture of Jones's use of alcohol and drugs, his estrangement from his bandmates, and his relationships with Anita Pallenberg and Anna Wohlin.

Cast
 Leo Gregory as Brian Jones
 Paddy Considine as Frank Thorogood
 David Morrissey as Tom Keylock
 Ben Whishaw as Keith Richards
 Luke de Woolfson as Mick Jagger
 Tuva Novotny as Anna Wohlin
 Amelia Warner as Janet
 Monet Mazur as Anita Pallenberg
 Ras Barker as The Lodger
 Gary Love as Jeff
 Will Adamsdale as Andrew Loog Oldham
 Josef Altin as Bill Wyman

Reception
The film was poorly received by critics. On Rotten Tomatoes, it holds a rating of 16% from 51 reviews with the consensus: "Poorly cast and sloppily assembled, Stoned turns one of rock 'n' roll's most darkly fascinating mysteries into a cinematic tragedy all its own."

References

External links
  Stoned at British Council–Film
  Stoned at BFI
  Stoned at Lumiere

2005 films
2005 directorial debut films
2000s biographical films
Biographical films about musicians
British biographical films
British rock music films
Cultural depictions of the Rolling Stones
Films based on multiple works
Films scored by David Arnold
Films set in East Sussex
Films set in the 1960s
Films shot at Pinewood Studios
Films with screenplays by Neal Purvis and Robert Wade
Number 9 Films films
The Rolling Stones films
Vertigo Films films
2000s English-language films
2000s British films